Song poems are songs with lyrics by usually non-professional writers that have been set to music by commercial companies for a fee. This practice, which has long been disparaged in the established music industry, was also known as song sharking and was conducted by several businesses throughout the 20th century in North America.

Production and promotion 
From the early 20th century, the business of recording song poems was promoted through small display ads in popular magazines, comic books, tabloids, men's adventure journals and similar  publications with a headline reading (essentially) Send in Your Poems - Songwriters Make Thousands of Dollars - Free Evaluation.  The term lyrics was avoided because it was assumed potential customers would not understand what the term meant. Those who sent their poetry to one of the production companies usually received notice by mail that their work was worthy of recording by professional musicians, along with a proposal to do so in exchange for a fee. The early 20th century versions of this business involved setting the words to music and printing up sheet music from inexpensively engraved plates.

In producing the recordings, musicians often recorded dozens of songs per recording session using minimal resources. Using a method called "sight-singing," they wrote the music as they read the lyrics and played along, sometimes finishing a song in just one take. Musicians would "sight-sing" Some of the companies recorded new vocals over pre-recorded music backing tracks, using the same music tracks hundreds of times. The recordings were then duplicated on 45 RPM vinyl singles or on individual cassette tapes, or they were released on compilation LPs with dozens of other songs by amateur lyric writers. Copies were sent to the customer. Promises that they would also be sent to radio stations or music industry executives were rarely if ever kept, partly because the recordings would not have been taken seriously by professionals.

Many of the lyrics involve subject matter relating to the passing fads of the day, and thus provide a window into a past pop culture.

Examples

Noted examples of those who have used the song poem approach include:

Rodd Keith (born Rodney Keith Eskelin, 1937–1974), who has been described as the "Mozart" of the song poem genre. Several compilations of his made-for-hire song poem recordings have been released on CD with comments by his son, avant-garde saxophonist Ellery Eskelin. Eskelin never really knew his father, but was often told that his father was some kind of musical genius.

Caglar Juan Singletary, (born 1972) who featured in the 2003 documentary Off The Charts: The Song-Poem Story.  His most famous composition is "Annie Oakley", music written by artist David Fox. 

Norridge Mayhams (1903–1988), also known as Norris the Troubadour, who issued a succession of records between the 1930s and 1980s, many produced by song-poem professionals.

Thomas J. Guygax Sr. (1921–1999), of Springfield, Missouri, a lyricist noted for his unconventional approach to word order and syntax.

John Trubee (born 1957), whose song "Peace & Love" (commonly known as "Blind Man's Penis"), written to test whether or not a song-poem firm would accept "the most ridiculous, stupid, vile, obscene" lyrics he could write, was recorded by country singer Ramsey Kearney; it has been described as "the most famous song-poem recording of all time".

In media

In 2003, a documentary about the industry, Off The Charts: The Song-Poem Story, was aired on the Public Broadcasting Service in the United States. Gene Merlino, who claims to have sung on more than 10,000 song poems, was featured in the documentary. It has since been released on DVD, and the soundtrack was released on CD.

The 2007 Craig Zobel drama Great World of Sound depicts a modern-day version of "song sharking," and featured scenes where real unsigned musicians audition for the actors portraying the ersatz music producers; these artists ultimately had their songs properly licensed and featured in the finished film.

Tom Ardolino, former drummer for the band NRBQ, curated an LP and several compilation CDs of the material taken from his personal collection (The Beat of The Traps, The Makers of Smooth Music, The Human Breakdown of Absurdity, & I'm Just The Other Woman). His work, along with the efforts of others such as Phil Milstein, musicologist Irwin Chusid of WFMU radio, Mark Mothersbaugh of Devo, Bob Purse, James Lindbloom, and magician Penn Jillette has allowed these scraps to reach a level of notoriety unthinkable in their own time.

Discography
Hollywood Gold, various artists (Rainbow Records) (one single, one cassette, 22 LPs)
MSR Madness series:
The Beat of The Traps, Various artists (Carnage Press)(LP only)
The Makers of Smooth Music, Various artists (Carnage Press)
The Human Breakdown of Absurdity, Various artists (Carnage Press)
I'm Just The Other Woman, Various artists (Carnage Press)
The American Song Poem Anthology: Do You Know The Difference Between Big Wood and Brush?, Various artists (Bar/None)
The American Song Poem Christmas: Daddy, Is Santa Really Six Foot Four?, Various artists (Bar/None)
I Died Today, Rodd Keith (Tzadik)
Ecstacy To Frenzy, Rodd Keith (Tzadik)
Saucers in the Sky, Rodd Keith (Roaratorio)
My Pipe-Yellow Dream, Rodd Keith (Roaratorio)
Black Phoenix Blues, Rodd Keith (Roaratorio)
Off The Charts: The Song Poem Story, Various artists (Red Rock Records - film soundtrack)
Song Poem Hits of 2007, David Dubowski One Man Band (Crazy Dave Records)
Song Poem Hits of 2007 Vol. 2, David Dubowski One Man Band (Crazy Dave Records)
Song Poem Hits of 2009, David Dubowski One Man Band (Crazy Dave Records)

Documentary

See also
Outsider music
Songshark
Vanity publisher
Poetry.com

References

External links
song poem music
WFMU-FM Radio Station
Shirley & Spinoza Internet Radio
Extraordinary Song-Poem Service
 Surreal O'Rama Song Poem Contest- Winners have their words set to music and recorded FREE
 Over 20 song-poems on YouTube by The Original Crazy Dave
Episode of This American Life featuring an interview with Ellery Eskelin's on his father's music

Song forms